The Bay class is a class of eight armed patrol boats, built by Austal and used by the Customs Marine Unit of the Australian Customs and Border Protection Service. They entered service during the late 1990s and early 2000s, and are primarily used on border protection duties.

The class was due to be replaced by 2010, but a request for tender was not issued until June of that year. The availability of the Bay class ships decreased during the later years of their service life. After the  began entering service, four of the Bays were offered to other forces; two each to the Sri Lankan Navy and the Malaysian Maritime Enforcement Agency.

Design and construction
The propulsion system consists of two MTU 16V 2000 M70 diesel engines, supplemented by a VosperThornycroft bow thruster. Each vessel is fitted with a 7.62 mm general purpose machine gun, and two Wiltrading Pursuit 640 vessels are carried for boarding operations. The sensor suite consists of a Racal Decca surface search radar operating in the E/F and I bands, and a Wesmar SS 390E dipping sonar. A Bay-class vessel has a crew of 12.

The Bay class was built by Austal. The eight ships were delivered over a period of 19 months, beginning in February 1999.

The Bay-class design was used as the basis for the 14 larger s in use with the Royal Australian Navy, and the 10 patrol boats used by the Yemen Navy.

Operational history
The eight patrol boats are operated by the Customs Marine Unit of the Australian Customs Service. They are primarily used to patrol Australia's economic exclusion zone, although they also operate in support of other Australian law enforcement and defence agencies, including but not limited to the Australian Federal Police, the Great Barrier Reef Marine Park Authority, and the Royal Australian Navy.

Bay-class vessels often operate on border protection duties under Border Protection Command. The age of the vessels and resulting maintenance needs has seen a drop in the amount of time spent at sea, with other ships of the Customs Marine Unit forced to take up the slack.

Foreign service
Two Bay-class patrol boats were gifted to the Sri Lankan Navy. Corio Bay was transferred on 30 March 2014, and Hervey Bay was handed over on 3 June that year. Originally renamed as SLNS Oshadi and SLNS Omaya, the patrol boats were recommissioned on 9 July as SLNS Mihikatha and SLNS Rathnadeepa.

Another two were offered to the Malaysian Maritime Enforcement Agency in 2014. Arnhem Bay was handed over on 10 February 2015, and was renamed KM Perwira. Dame Roma Mitchell was transferred in May 2015, and renamed KM Satria.

Replacement

The Bay class were due to be replaced in 2010, but it was not until June of that year that a request for tender was issued for eight new, larger patrol boats. Austal received the tender for eight  patrol boats on 12 August 2011.

The new patrol boats entered service between March 2013 and September 2015. Most Bay Class vessels were retired prior to Australian Customs and Border Protection Service being reformed into the Australian Border Force (ABF). Only 2 Bay Class vessels, the Roebuck Bay and Storm Bay, are still in service with the ABF

Ships

ACV Roebuck Bay (ABFC 200) 
ACV Holdfast Bay (ACV 20) 
ACV Botany Bay (ACV 30) 
ACV Hervey Bay (ACV 40) now SLNS Rathnadeepa
ACV Corio Bay (ACV 50) now SLNS Mihikatha
ACV Arnhem Bay (ACV 60) now KM Perwira
ACV Dame Roma Mitchell (ACV 70) now KM Satria
ACV Storm Bay (ABFC 210)

Citations

References

Books

News articles

 Alt URL

Websites

External links

Patrol vessels of the Marine Unit (Australian Border Force)
Patrol boat classes
Ships built by Austal